Sasino  is a village in the administrative district of Gmina Choczewo, within Wejherowo County, Pomeranian Voivodeship, in northern Poland. Its population is 474.

Geography

See also
History of Pomerania

References

External links

Sasino